The table tennis competition at the 1992 Summer Olympics consisted of four events.

Participating nations
A total of 159 athletes (80 men and 79 women), representing 48 NOCs, competed in four events.

Medal summary

Medal table

References

Sources
 Official Olympic Report
 International Table Tennis Federation (ITTF)
 

 
1992 Summer Olympics events
1992
1992 in table tennis